Tom Gibson (September 1, 1888 – December 6, 1950) was an American screenwriter and film director. He wrote for more than 70 films between 1915 and 1946. He also directed 16 films between 1923 and 1937. He was born in Boston, Massachusetts and died in Burbank, California.

Selected filmography
 Bull's Eye (1917)
 The Midnight Man (1917)
 High Speed (1917)
 Wolves of the Street (1920)
 Paying the Limit (1924)
 Getting Her Man (1924)
 West of Arizona (1925)
 Reckless Courage (1925)
 Lightning Reporter (1926)
 Kid Boots (1926)
 The Climbers (1927)
 Thus is Life (1930)
 The Great Adventures of Wild Bill Hickok (1938)
 Covered Wagon Trails (1940)
 Wild Horse Range (1940)

External links

1888 births
1950 deaths
American male screenwriters
American film directors
20th-century American male writers
20th-century American screenwriters